Marius may refer to:

People

Gaius Marius (157 BC-86 BC), Roman statesman, seven times consul.

Arts and entertainment
 Marius (play), a 1929 play by Marcel Pagnol
 "Marius" (short story), a 1957 story by Poul Anderson
 Marius (1931 film), a French adaptation of Pagnol's play, directed by Alexander Korda
 Marius (2013 film), a French adaptation of Pagnol's play, directed by Daniel Auteuil

Places
 Marius (Laconia), a town of ancient Laconia, Greece
 Măriuș, a village in Valea Vinului, Satu Mare County, Romania
 Marius (crater), on the Moon
 Marius Hills, on the Moon

Other uses
 Marius (name), a male given name, a Roman clan name and family name, and a modern name or surname
 Marius (commando), Alain Alivon (born 1965), French Navy officer
 Marius (giraffe), a giraffe euthanized at the Copenhagen Zoo in 2014

See also

 
 
 Mario (disambiguation)
 Maria (disambiguation)
 Mary (disambiguation)